Tortillas pour les Daltons is a Lucky Luke adventure written by Goscinny and illustrated by Morris, published by Dupuis in 1967. It was translated into English as Tortillas for the Daltons, published by Cinebook in 2008.

Plot

While being moved from their regular prison to a newer prison, situated near the Rio Grande, the wagon containing the Dalton gang is hijacked by the infamous Mexican bandit Emílio Espuelas and his men. The two gangs team up to kidnap the local mayor, disguising the Daltons as mariachi musicians.

Meanwhile, the Mexican ambassador to The United States of America has threatened with decreased diplomatic relations and, ultimately, war, unless the Daltons are returned to the US. Lucky Luke departs to Mexico by direct order of the president.

Ultimately the grand scheme is foiled by Lucky Luke switching places with the mayor and Averell revealing the Daltons plan of double-crossing the Mexicans while drunk on tequila.

Back across the border Luke is awarded a medal and Averell flaunts his new expression: "¿Cuando se come aqui?".

Characters 

 Emílio Espuelas: Mexican bandit who joins forces with the Daltons.
 The Daltons: Four despondent, stupid and ugly bandit brothers.

External links
Lucky Luke official site album index 
Goscinny website on Lucky Luke

Comics by Morris (cartoonist)
Lucky Luke albums
1967 graphic novels
Works by René Goscinny
Comics set in Mexico